Jim Jensen (born 1934)  was a Nebraska state senator from Omaha, Nebraska in the Nebraska Legislature and contractor. 

Personal life
He was born on Jan. 17, 1934, in Omaha, Nebraska and graduated from  a Technical High School in Omaha and Omaha University (now University of Nebraska at Omaha). He served as a second lieutenant in the U.S. National Guard from 1952 to 1961.  He is a board member First Westroads Bank, Metropolitan Omaha Builders Association, and PRIDE Omaha, on the board of directors for Grace University and the chairman of Electronic Benefit Transfer Task Force and past chairman of Omaha zoning board of appeals.  He has five children and 16 grandchildren and has had a real estate broker's license since 1963.

State legislature
He was elected in 1994 to represent the 20th  Nebraska legislative district and reelected in 1998 and 2002.  He sat on the Banking, Commerce and Insurance, Building Maintenance committees as well as the Committee on Committees and chairperson of the Health and Human Services committee and the Behavioral Health Oversight Commission. Since Nebraska voters passed Initiative Measure 415 in 2001 limiting state senators to two terms after 2001, he was unable to run for reelection in 2006.

References
 
 

1934 births
Living people
Nebraska state senators
Politicians from Omaha, Nebraska
Businesspeople from Omaha, Nebraska
Nebraska National Guard personnel
University of Nebraska Omaha alumni